Brett Joseph Sheehy AO (born 23 November 1958) is an Australian artistic director, producer and curator. He is currently a CEO of the Melbourne Theatre Company (MTC), and is the only person to be appointed to direct three of the five international arts festivals in Australia's State capital cities namely: Sydney Festival, Adelaide Festival and Melbourne Festival.

Family background, early life and education 

Sheehy was born and raised in Brisbane, Queensland. His father Gabriel Joseph "Joe" Sheehy is a retired civil and structural engineer, and founder of the consulting engineering firm Sheehy & Partners Pty Ltd, and his mother Joan Sheehy (née O'Sullivan) is a homemaker and charity worker, particularly with the Vietnamese refugee community who arrived in Brisbane following the Vietnam War.

Sheehy was educated at St. Joseph's Christian Brothers College, Gregory Terrace, Brisbane and then at University of Queensland where he studied arts/law.
Several of his family have been involved in law and public service in Queensland. His grandfather Sir Joseph Sheehy KBE served as Senior Puisne Judge of the Queensland Supreme Court, as Administrator of the State of Queensland in 1965 and 1969, and as Deputy Governor and Acting Governor.

Sheehy's maternal grandfather John Roger O'Sullivan also served the State as architect of public and community housing for the Queensland Government, while another great-uncle, two uncles (including District Court Judge Leo McNamara), his sister and several first cousins all practised law.

As a boy, Sheehy lived with a third uncle, property developer Rick O'Sullivan, and his family on several occasions when Sheehy's mother endured lengthy illnesses. O'Sullivan was co-owner of the racehorse Think Big which won the Melbourne Cup in 1974 and 1975. 
 
Despite several family members' legal background, Sheehy completed only three years of his law studies and his articled clerkship at Short, Punch & Greatorix Solicitors on Queensland's Gold Coast, before abandoning law and moving to Sydney in 1983.

Sydney Theatre Company 

In Sydney, Sheehy became a theatre critic for the now defunct Sydney City Express newspaper and in late 1984 joined the Sydney Theatre Company (STC) under the stewardship of Richard Wherrett. At STC he held various positions over a ten-year period including Artistic Associate, Literary Manager and Deputy General Manager, and he was dramaturg of a dozen productions.

While at STC, Sheehy is credited with helping give Sydney the now often-used moniker and nickname of 'Emerald City' by suggesting this as the title for playwright David Williamson's 1987 play about the city, which Williamson accepted, adding a line of dialogue "The Emerald City of Oz. Everyone comes here along their yellow brick roads looking for the answers to their problems and all they find are the demons within themselves." The play Emerald City was produced nationally and later toured to the West End in London.

Sheehy's dramaturgy credits at STC included Larry Kramer's The Normal Heart (for the Australian premiere production directed by Wayne Harrison, who succeeded Wherrett as STC's Artistic Director & CEO); Romeo and Juliet (see Personal life below), Arthur Miller's The Crucible, and Oscar Wilde's An Ideal Husband starring Richard Roxburgh (all directed by Wherrett); and Michael Hastings' Tom & Viv starring Ruth Cracknell and Robyn Nevin. Sheehy was also Assistant to the Director on Wherrett's production of  Hedda Gabler starring Judy Davis.

In 1991 Sheehy was involved in challenging the automatic attribution of world-wide English-speaking rights in American plays to US producers, which could prevent their presentation in Australia for several years following their Broadway premieres.

Sydney Festival 

In 1995 Sheehy left STC to become Administrator of Sydney Festival (Sydney's international arts festival, and Australia's largest arts festival) under the leadership of Anthony Steel and in 1997 became Deputy Director to Steel's successor, Leo Schofield. Sheehy completed four Sydney Festivals as Schofield's deputy (1998 to 2001) and succeeded Schofield as Festival Director and CEO in February 2001.
 Sheehy's four Sydney Festivals (2002 to 2005) included 37 world premieres, saw the festival double its box office attendances, posted four successive financial surpluses, recorded a 30% increase in attendances to free outdoor events, established satellite festival precincts at Fox Studios Australia and in Greater Sydney, developed a following in the 18 to 35 age group, was voted Sydney's Best and Most Popular Event by the Sydney Chamber of Commerce, and was twice named the Best Event in New South Wales (2003 and 2005) by NSW Tourism (since renamed Destination NSW).
 
 
Some features of Sheehy's Sydney Festival programs included the first precinct-wide special effects lighting of historic buildings, titled Neon Colonial, which was later mirrored and extended by the Vivid Sydney festival; the curation of chamber music programs by guest composers Michael Berkeley (now Baron Berkeley of Knighton) and Brett Dean; large-scale outdoor visual art installations (including those by Michael Riley and Nam June Paik); outdoor concerts (including two concerts annually in Sydney's Domain, playing to audiences of between 70,000 and 100,000 each); expansive indoor and outdoor theatre performances including the Australian debuts of Théâtre du Soleil, Compagnia Di Valerio Festi, Les Arts Sauts (with Ian Scobie's Arts Projects Australia) and Transe Express, as well as Improbable theatre's Sticky and La Fura Dels Baus's OBS Macbeth; and the epic outdoor Indigenous productions Crying Baby and Eora Crossing.

Heiner Goebbels' Hashirigaki, Osvaldo Golijov's La Pasión según San Marcos, Sir Ian McKellen in Dance of Death, London Sinfonietta, Jon Lord's Concerto for Group and Orchestra, Asian Dub Foundation and the performance-poetry Broadway hit Def Poetry Jam also saw sell-out performances, along with the Festival's co-commission of the international production of The Black Rider by Tom Waits, Robert Wilson and William S. Burroughs, directed by Wilson.

Sheehy's final Sydney Festival event at the Sydney Opera House Concert Hall, the Came So Far For Beauty Leonard Cohen tribute concert starring Jarvis Cocker, Beth Orton, Nick Cave, Rufus Wainwright and Antony Hegarty among others, was filmed and recorded for the international documentary and album Leonard Cohen: I'm Your Man.

During Sheehy's Sydney Festival tenure, two of Sydney Festival's corporate partnerships received Australian Business Arts Foundation (ABAF) Awards including Australia's Corporate Partnership of the Year.

Adelaide Festival 

In 2003 Sheehy was appointed Artistic Director of the then-biennial Adelaide Festival to succeed Stephen Page following Page's 2004 Festival. Previous Adelaide Festival directors had included Sir Robert Helpmann; Anthony Steel; George Lascelles, 7th Earl of Harewood; Barrie Kosky; Robyn Archer and Peter Sellars. Sheehy directed the 2006 and 2008 Adelaide Festivals.

The reception of the 2006 Festival was positive.  Australian media claimed Sheehy had restored Adelaide Festival's status as the preeminent arts festival of Australia. The Murdoch News Limited press headlined "Festival Back As Best In Nation", and the Fairfax Media echoed these sentiments. The subsequent 2008 Festival broke box office and attendance records for Adelaide Festival's 48-year history, and was claimed to have been the world's first carbon-neutral international arts festival, achieved in concert with the South Australian Government.

One of Sheehy's first Adelaide Festival productions was the Festival's co-commission Here Lies Love by David Byrne and Fatboy Slim (Norman Cook) which premiered as a song cycle in Adelaide on 10 March 2006.  A concert version was later performed at Carnegie Hall and it was then developed into a rock musical premiering at The Public Theater in New York in 2013, and opening at the Royal National Theatre in London in October 2014.

Other features of his Adelaide programs included the Australian debut of the Schaubühne of Berlin (see Festival milestones below), the pairing of Akram Khan and Sylvie Guillem, the creation of the Northern Lights installation, The Persian Garden venues and clubs, the reconstitution of the Mahavishnu Orchestra, DV8 Physical Theatre's To Be Straight With You, Pat Metheny, the Royal Shakespeare Company's Indian version of A Midsummer Night's Dream (presented with Ian Scobie's Arts Projects Australia), Jonathan Dove's opera Flight, Osvaldo Golijov's opera Ainadamar (which won two Grammy Awards for Best Contemporary Classical Composition and Best Opera Recording) and the multi-gallery Video Venice survey featuring highlights of the 2005 Venice Biennale.

In Adelaide, Sheehy's team secured with Adelaide Bank the largest arts sponsorship in the State of South Australia, at $3 million over three festivals with an option on a further two festivals.

Melbourne Festival 

In 2008 Sheehy was appointed Artistic Director and co-CEO of the annual Melbourne Festival (then the Melbourne International Arts Festival) where he directed the 2009 to 2012 Festivals. His predecessors in the position included Gian Carlo Menotti, Academy Award winner John Truscott, Sir Jonathan Mills and Robyn Archer.

At Melbourne Festival, the commissioning and presentation of the three premiere productions of Dirtsong (2009), Seven Songs to Leave Behind (2010) and Notes From the Hard Road And Beyond (2011) by the Indigenous music ensemble The Black Arm Band were significant events, directed by Steven Richardson. The first was a celebration of preservation of Indigenous languages with Miles Franklin Award-winner Alexis Wright; the second an international collaboration by contemporary Indigenous singers and musicians including the legendary Gurrumul Yunupingu joined by Sinéad O'Connor, John Cale, Rickie Lee Jones and Meshell Ndegeocello; and the third saw Mavis Staples, Joss Stone, Emmanuel Jal and Paul Dempsey join The Black Arm Band to celebrate protest music from the 1960s through to contemporary Indigenous songs of activism.

The 2009 Melbourne Festival saw a 55% increase in the festival's economic impact on the city of Melbourne, with his subsequent Festival programs growing that figure by another 41% to $39.5 million, resulting in an overall increase of 120% (independent figures by Roy Morgan Research and Sweeney Research). The Age newspaper claimed that in 2009 the Festival "regained much of the tensile strength it lost in recent years (with a program which) made this year's festival special and so beguiling."

Sheehy's 2011 Melbourne Festival broke box office records for that festival's 27-year history and the four Melbourne Festivals directed by him featured the Australian debuts of Ivo van Hove and Toneelgroep Amsterdam, Sasha Waltz and Guests, the National Theatre Company of China, Emmanuel Jal, Deutsches Schauspielhaus Hamburg and Sebastian Nübling, Calder Quartet, Fischerspooner, Pan Pan Theatre, Brain Failure, Caroline Stein, Stigmata, Hofesh Shechter Company, Beans, Peeping Tom Collective, Maxim Rysanov, James Rhodes, Isango Portobello Ensemble, Ramallah Underground, Lithuanian Chamber Orchestra, Quartetthaus, and the sculptural works of Russian art collective AES+F.
In Melbourne Sheehy also programmed his first composer-in-residence suite of works, with British composer Thomas Adès, as well as the London Philharmonic Orchestra (hosting the Orchestra's Patron HRH Prince Edward, Duke of Kent). These and other classical music presentations were in counterpoint to Sheehy's contemporary music programs, curated with Hannah Fox and Tom Supple, mostly staged at Melbourne's historic Forum Theatre. International and national music artists performed in genres as diverse as post-rock, noise rock, psychedelic jazz-hop, R&B funk-rap, synthpop, electroclash and extreme metal, with geographic surveys from Palestinian hip-hop to Chinese indie rock, hardcore and punk to Sri Lankan heavy metal.

For the opening weekend of Sheehy's final Melbourne Festival program he returned to an artist from the Sydney Festival's Came So Far For Beauty concerts, Antony Hegarty, and presented the Museum of Modern Art commission Swanlights  – a musical artwork created by Antony, Chris Levine and Carl Robertshaw with 44-piece orchestra, based on the Antony and the Johnsons album of the same name. The production Swanlights had been presented one other night previously, at Radio City Music Hall in New York City. For the Melbourne presentations Antony was joined by Boy George, who also appeared at the 2012 Melbourne Festival Hub.  Other featured international artists that year were The Forsythe Company, Akram Khan Company, the Schaubühne of Berlin, Michel van der Aa, Thurston Moore, Billy Bragg, Lee Ranaldo, Young Jean Lee's Theater Company, Gob Squad, Nilaja Sun, THEESatisfaction, Hahn-Bin, Tim Fain, Duo Amal, Santiago Sierra and Gregory Crewdson.

Festival milestones 

Australian works that were developed or premiered at festivals Sheehy directed have toured nationally and internationally, including works by the dance ensemble Force Majeure, William Yang's Shadows, Stephen Sewell and Basil Hogios's Three Furies: Scenes From the Life of Francis Bacon, Andrew Bovell's When the Rain Stops Falling, Ranters Theatre's Intimacy, Chunky Move and Victorian Opera's Assembly, Chunky Move's Tense Dave, Australian Dance Theatre's Devolution, Sir Jonathan Mills and Dorothy Porter's opera The Eternity Man (originally commissioned by Almeida Theatre), the Indigenous music-theatre work Crying Baby, John Romeril and Jack Charles' Jack Charles vs The Crown and Foley the autobiographical stage production starring Indigenous activist Gary Foley.

Sheehy's festival programs focus on premiering new Australian works, mounting outdoor productions and installations, programming visual arts and film components, and presenting international artists whose stage work had previously not been seen in Australia.

Companies and artists who made their Australian stage debuts at Sheehy's festivals include Théâtre du Soleil and Ariane Mnouchkine, Amsterdam Sinfonietta, National Theatre of Colombia, the Schaubühne of Berlin and Thomas Ostermeier, The Forsythe Company, Ivo van Hove and Toneelgroep Amsterdam, Sasha Waltz and Guests, the National Theatre of China, Hofesh Shechter Company, Shen Wei Dance Arts, the Ballet Boyz, Sir Ian McKellen, Osvaldo Golijov, Glyndebourne Festival Opera, Talvin Singh, James Thiérrée, DJ Spooky, Rufus Wainwright and Antony Hegarty (of Antony and the Johnsons) among others. International visual artists receiving their Australian debuts at Sheehy's festivals include Elisa Sighicelli, Francesco Vezzoli, Ivan Navarro, Zhang Ga and Guy Ben-Ner.

The co-commissioning of both the 2004/5 production of The Black Rider (starring Marianne Faithfull and then Nigel Richards) for Sydney Festival and the 2005/6 production of Here Lies Love (with David Byrne himself performing) for Adelaide Festival, meant that these festivals staged the Australian debuts of the music-theatre works of Tom Waits, David Byrne and Fatboy Slim (Norman Cook). Another of Sheehy's international co-commissions was the 2007/8 production of Philip Glass and Leonard Cohen's Book of Longing. Sheehy's Adelaide Festival and Melbourne Festival programs in particular featured international contemporary operas, and the 2009 Melbourne Festival co-commissioned Rufus Wainwright's first opera production Prima Donna, but to date it has not been presented in Australia.

Sheehy has been variously dubbed 'Mr Sydney' and Australia's 'Mr Festival' due to his extensive festival career which began with his ten-year tenure at Sydney Festival.

Melbourne Theatre Company 

In February 2011 Sheehy was appointed Artistic Director and CEO of Melbourne Theatre Company, to succeed Simon Phillips.

At Melbourne Theatre Company, Sheehy's inaugural season in 2013 included MTC's first presentation of an international West End production (with Arts Centre Melbourne), the Royal National Theatre's One Man, Two Guvnors; Australia's first festival of independent theatre NEON; the first stage-play by singer, songwriter, author and actor Eddie Perfect; the MTC debut of director Simon Stone; film and stage actor David Wenham in The Crucible; the family production The Book of Everything; the Company's inaugural Women Directors Program; and the inaugural MTC CONNECT Diverse Artists Program with Multicultural Arts Victoria. This resulted in MTC's highest box office in its 60-year history, with attendances of 263,000 and 19,800 subscribers, the largest theatre subscriber base in Australia. The Age newspaper's end-of-year editorial claimed the 2013 program was jointly responsible (with National Gallery of Victoria's 2013 program) for Melbourne's cultural renaissance in that year.

In 2014 MTC toured its production of Rupert, David Williamson's satirical bio-play about the life of Rupert Murdoch, to Kennedy Center in Washington D.C.  Sheehy's 2014 program also included the second NEON Festival of Independent Theatre; the first stage-play by Australian film and television artists Working Dog Productions The Speechmaker; MTC's co-presentation of musical Once with Gordon Frost Organisation; and a regional tour of its education production Yellow Moon. 2014 also saw MTC's first mainstage multi-artform production, with dance ensemble Chunky Move, of Falk Richter and Anouk van Dijk's Complexity of Belonging which opened the 2014 Melbourne Festival and opens the Spring Festival in Utrecht, Netherlands in early 2015, followed by seasons at Schaubühne Berlin and Théâtre National de Chaillot in Paris.

Other appointments 

Mentor, Foundation for Young Australians' World of Work Program (2014)
Mentor, Australia Council's Emerging Leaders Development Program (since 2012)
Judge, Sidney Myer Performing Arts Awards (since 2012)
board member, SBS (Special Broadcasting Service) Subscription TV Ltd. (2011 to 2012)
Artistic Director, Cultural Program, 5th Biennial World Summit on Arts and Culture presented by the 76 country alliance of the International Federation of Arts Councils and Culture Agencies (2011)
Mentor and Selector, Harold Mitchell Foundation Fellowship (2009 to 2012)
Member, Artists' Advisory Panel, Bell Shakespeare Company (2009 to 2012)
Founding Ambassador, Australia Council's We All Play a Part initiative encouraging nationwide community involvement in the arts (since 2008)
Member, Creative Australia, Australia 2020 Summit (2008)
Member, Power Panel, Australian Financial Review Magazine (2005 to 2008)
Member, Arts Advisory Group, ABC (Australian Broadcasting Corporation) (2003 to 2005)
Member, Committee for Sydney (2001 to 2005)
board member, Australian Theatre for Young People (1999 to 2003)
Member, Arts and Events Committee, NSW Centenary of Federation (1998 to 2001)
Member, Sydney Carnivale Council (1996 to 1998)
Member, Sydney Writers' Festival Committee (1995 to 1997)
Script Assessor, Australia Council (1989 to 1990)
Reader, Australian National Playwrights' Centre (1988 to 1989)
Judge (with Glenn A. Baker), Sydney Rock and Roll Eisteddfod (1986 to 1988)

Awards and honours 
In 2012 the second highest civilian honour in Australia, Officer of the Order of Australia (AO), was awarded to Sheehy. With this appointment he became one of the few Australians to have received a national honours citation for distinguished service to both artistic disciplines of the 'performing arts' and the 'visual arts'.

Sheehy's other awards have included:

 Twice Winner (with Geoffrey Gifford), International Society for the Performing Arts (ISPA) Award – Best Design Direct Mail Sales Brochure (1993 and 1994)
 Winner, the 1991 Mobil Fellowship in Arts Administration (1991)
 Winner, the 1987 Qantas International Theatre Scholarship (1987)

In 2005 Sheehy was named by The Australian Financial Review Magazine as one of the 20 Australians to be watched for their impact on society up to the year 2020, and in 2007 he was named by ABC's Limelight magazine as one of the five most influential arts figures in Australia, an attribution repeated in 2011 when The Australian Financial Review Magazine named him as one of Australia's five leading arts identities – with then-Federal Arts Minister Simon Crean, National Gallery of Victoria Director Tony Ellwood, actor Cate Blanchett and Sydney Opera House CEO Louise Herron.

In 2002 Sheehy was painted by artist Paul Newton for the Archibald Prize, with the painting subsequently being a finalist in the 2004 Doug Moran National Portrait Prize, the richest portrait prize in the world. Sheehy was again painted for the Archibald Prize in 2012 by artist Caroline Thew.

Publications 

Willsteed, T. & Sheehy, B. (eds.) (1989) Sydney Theatre Company 1978 to 1988, Focus Books

Personal life 

Sheehy's partner, since August 1994, is chef Steven Nicholls.

Sheehy's former partner, medical practitioner Dr Paul Weber, suicided in the early hours of 28 May 1989. Weber left a message on Sheehy's phone indicating he was about to take his own life. Sheehy and Richard Wherrett, who had both been working at a preview performance of Sydney Theatre Company's Romeo and Juliet at the Sydney Opera House that night, together found Weber's body. Weber's medical practice had been devoted almost exclusively to treating AIDS patients, and the consistent loss of his patients' lives drove Weber into deep depression. While Sheehy has only twice publicly alluded to the events of that night, Wherrett described them in some detail in his autobiography The Floor of Heaven.

References

Australian theatre managers and producers
1958 births
Living people
Officers of the Order of Australia
Australian gay men
20th-century Australian LGBT people
21st-century Australian LGBT people
Australian art curators